The 2011–12 season was Notts County Football Club's 123rd year in The Football League.

Season review

Kits
Fila will become Notts County's kit suppliers this season, after signing a three-year contract. With Nottingham based solicitors, Fraser Brown, sponsor the home shirt and Vision Express sponsoring the away shirt.

Pre-season
Notts County began their pre-season with two games on the same day. Half of the squad played at newly formed Ilkeston FC, the game finished 2–2, while the other half of the squad won 1–0 at Hucknall Town FC. They then lost 2–0 at Hinkley United before a 1–0 win at Kettering Town. Notts then won 2–1 at Nottinghamshire rivals Mansfield Town before two home games – a 3–2 defeat to Peterborough United and a 1–1 draw with Wolverhampton wanderers. They then lost 2–0 at Corby Town – this the first game at Corby's new home ground - Steel Park. Pre Season finished with a 1–0 defeat at Macclesfield Town and a 3–2 defeat at Maidenhead United.

League
Notts County began their league campaign with a 3–0 victory on the road at Carlisle United, before losing their first home game of the season to Charlton Athletic. They then beat Tranmere rovers 3–2 thanks to an injury time penalty in a feisty affair at Meadow Lane. This was followed by back to back defeats at Sheffield Wednesday and Preston North End. They then went unbeaten through September, winning 3–1 at home to AFC Bournemouth before heading out to Turin to take on Juventus in a showpiece friendly to open Juventus's new stadium. The game ended in a 1–1 draw.
Notts returned to league action with a 2–1 win at home to Walsall before drawing at Exeter City. They ended September with two 2–0 wins at Stevenage and at home to Rochdale.
October began with a 3–0 loss at Milton Keynes Dons, before County themselves won 3–0 at home to Hartlepool United. They then won 3–1 at Chesterfield in a local derby. This was followed up by draws at home to Brentford and away to Bury, before going down 4–2 at Colchester United. 
November saw Notts draw with Wycombe Wanderers, lose at Huddersfield Town, and win at home to Scunthorpe united. 

December saw Notts County suffer defeats to Yeovil Town, Leyton Orient, Sheffield United and Oldham Athletic.
January signalled the start of Notts County's 150th Anniversary, and they began with a 2–2 draw at home to Huddersfield Town. They then lost to AFC Bournemouth before draws against Milton Keynes Dons and Preston North End. 
They ended January with a 1–0 win away to Walsall before a 2–1 win over Exeter City. County then lost 3–0 at Hartlepool United, after which manager Martin Allen was sacked, and replaced by former England International Keith Curle. His tenure began with 4 straight wins over Stevenage, Chesterfield, Rochdale and Carlisle United before a 1–1 draw at Tranmere Rovers. However, they followed this up with a shock 4–2 win away at runaway leaders Charlton Athletic. But Notts were brought quickly back down to earth with defeats at home to Sheffield Wednesday and Sheffield United. 
A draw at Scunthorpe United followed before wins over Oldham Athletic, Leyton Orient, and Yeovil Town moved County right into the battle for the league's final play off spot. 
A 0–0 draw at Brentford had moved County into pole position to claim that final play off spot, but they suffered a surprise 4–2 defeat at home to Bury.
Despite wins over Wycombe Wanderers and Colchester united in their final two games, Notts County missed out on the playoffs on goal difference.

League Cup
County lost in the first round away from home at their neighbours Nottingham Forest but only after a highly exciting game. the two sides were level at 2–2 after 90 minutes so they went to extra time. Notts went 3–2 up, and were seconds away from victory before Wes Morgan equalised for Forest. County lost on penalties.

FA Cup
Round 1 saw Notts comfortably beat league two side Accrington Stanley 4–1, before a 2–0 win away at Conference South high flyers Sutton United. A 2–0 win away at Championship club Doncaster Rovers followed before County were knocked out by fellow league one club Stevenage, costing them a home tie with Tottenham Hotspurs.

League One

Standings

Results summary

Result round by round

FA Cup

League Cup

Squad

Detailed overview

Statistics

|-
|colspan="14"|Players played for Notts County this season but who have left the club:

|}

Captains

Goalscoring record

Disciplinary record

Penalties

Suspensions serves

Transfers

In

Out

Notes
1Although officially undisclosed, The Star reported the fee to be around £70,000

Contracts

Fixtures and results

Pre-season

League One

FA Cup

League Cup

Competition summary

Awards 
 Supporters' Player of the Year: Alan Judge
 Players' Player of the Year: Alan Judge
 Manager's Player of the Year: Jeff Hughes
 Golden Boot: Jeff Hughes
 Goal of the Year: Lee Hughes
 Community Award: Mike Edwards
 Youth Players' Player of the Year: Fabian Spiess
 Youth Manager's Player of the Year: Fabian Spiess
 Youth Golden Boot: Jonathan Boyack
 Youth Goal of the Year: Jonathan Boyack

References

Notts County F.C. seasons
Notts County